Thomas Kennedy (born May 17, 1987) is an American born Japanese professional basketball player for Ibaraki Robots in Japanese B.League.

Career statistics 

|-
| align="left" |  2011-12
| align="left"| Iwate
| 51 || 44 || 33.3 || .425 || .337 || .776 || 6.1 || 1.3 || 1.0 || 0.2 ||  18.0
|-
|  align="left"  style="background-color:#afe6ba; border: 1px solid gray" |  2012-13†
| align="left" | Yokohama
| 52 || 46 || 29.6 || .460 || .358 || .805 || 7.0 || 1.1 || 1.2 || 0.3 || 18.8
|-
| align="left" |  2013-14
| align="left" | Shimane
| 10 ||10  || 36.3 || .400 || .244 || .853 || 7.5 || 2.9 || 1.3 || 0.7 ||  17.1
|-
| align="left" | 2013-14
| align="left" | Chiba
| 14 || 14 || 25.9 || .442 || .365 || .636 || 5.4 || 1.5 || 1.0 || 0.4 ||  14.2
|-
| align="left" | 2013-14
| align="left" | Niigata
| 22 || 15 || 30.7 || .442 || .382 || .817 || 5.8 || 1.5 || 0.9 || 0.4 || 18.0 
|-
| align="left" |  2014-15
| align="left" | Niigata
| 52||52 || 31.6|| .458|| .371|| .787|| 6.3|| 2.3|| 1.2|| 0.4|| 18.1
|-
| align="left" |  2015-16
| align="left" | Gunma
|52 ||52 ||32.6 ||.478 ||.311 ||.817 ||7.2 ||2.1 ||1.1 ||0.1 || 24.6
|-

References

1987 births
Living people
American expatriate basketball people in Austria
American expatriate basketball people in France
American expatriate basketball people in Japan
American men's basketball players
Detroit Mercy Titans men's basketball players
Gunma Crane Thunders players
Hiroshima Dragonflies players
Iwate Big Bulls players
Niigata Albirex BB players
Shimane Susanoo Magic players
Yokohama B-Corsairs players
Power forwards (basketball)